Michelle Alexander (born October 7, 1967) is an American writer and civil rights activist. She is best known for her 2010 book The New Jim Crow: Mass Incarceration in the Age of Colorblindness. Since 2018, she has been an opinion columnist for The New York Times.

Early life
Alexander was born on October 7, 1967, in Chicago, Illinois, to an interracial couple, John Alexander and Sandra Alexander (née Huck) who were wed in 1965. In 1977, the family moved to the San Francisco area, where her father worked as a salesman for IBM.

Alexander attended high school in Ashland, Oregon, with her younger sister, Leslie Alexander, who later became a professor of History and African American Studies and the author of 2008's African or American? Black Identity in New York City, 1784–1861.

Alexander earned a B.A. degree from Vanderbilt University, where she received a Truman Scholarship. She earned a J.D. degree from Stanford Law School.

Career 

Alexander served as director of the Racial Justice Project at the American Civil Liberties Union (ACLU) of Northern California from 1998 until 2005, which led a national campaign against racial profiling by law enforcement. She directed the Civil Rights Clinic at Stanford Law School and was a law clerk for Justice Harry Blackmun at the U. S. Supreme Court and for Chief Judge Abner Mikva on the United States Court of Appeals for the D.C. Circuit. As an associate at Saperstein, Goldstein, Demchak & Baller, she specialized in plaintiff-side class action suits alleging race and gender discrimination.

Alexander was a visiting professor at Union Theological Seminary in the City of New York from 2016-2021.

In 2018, she was hired as an opinion columnist at The New York Times. There she collaborated on a piece with Leslie Alexander entitled “Fear” which became a chapter in Nikole Hannah-Jones’s “The 1619 Project.”

The New Jim Crow

Alexander published her book The New Jim Crow: Mass Incarceration in the Age of Colorblindness in 2010. In it, she argued that systemic racial discrimination in the United States resumed following the Civil Rights Movement, and that the resumption is embedded in the US War on Drugs and other governmental policies and is having devastating social consequences. She considered the scope and impact of this to be comparable with that of the Jim Crow laws of the 19th and 20th centuries. Her book concentrated on the high rate of incarceration of African-American men for various crimes. Alexander wrote, "Race plays a major role—indeed, a defining role—in the current system, but not because of what is commonly understood as old-fashioned, hostile bigotry. This system of control depends far more on racial indifference (defined as a lack of compassion and caring about race and racial groups) than racial hostility – a feature it actually shares with its predecessors."

The New Jim Crow described how she believes oppressed minorities are "subject to legalized discrimination in employment, housing, public benefits, and jury service, just as their parents, grandparents, and great-grandparents once were." Alexander argued the harsh penalty of how "people whose only crime is drug addiction or possession of a small amount of drugs for recreational use find themselves locked out of the mainstream society—permanently—and also highlights the inequality presented from the fact that "blacks are admitted to prison on drug charges at a rate from twenty to fifty-seven times greater than that of white men."

The New Jim Crow was re-released in paperback in 2012. As of March 2012 it had been on The New York Times Best Seller list for six weeks and it also reached number 1 on the Washington Post bestseller list in 2012. The book has been the subject of scholarly debate and criticism.

In the fall of 2015, all freshmen enrolled at Brown University read The New Jim Crow as part of the campus's First Readings Program initiated by the Office of the Dean of the College and voted on by the faculty.

Yale University clinical law professor James Forman Jr., while acknowledging many similarities and insights in the Jim Crow analogy, has argued that Alexander overstates her case for decarceration, and leaves out important ways in which the newer system of mass incarceration is different. Forman Jr. identifies Alexander as one of a number of authors who have overstated and misstated their case. He asserts that her framework over-emphasizes the War on Drugs, and ignores violent crimes, arguing that Alexander's analysis is demographically simplistic.

Alexander refers to electronic ankle monitoring practices as the "Newest Jim Crow," increasingly segregating people of color under bail reform laws that "look good on paper" but are based on a presumption of guilt and replace bail with shackles as pre-trial detainees consent to electronic monitoring in order to be released from jail.

Hidden Colors 2
Alexander appeared in a 2012 documentary Hidden Colors 2: The Triumph of Melanin, in which she discussed the impact of mass incarceration in melanoid communities. Alexander said: "Today there are more African American adults, under correctional control, in prison or jail, on probation or parole than were enslaved in 1850 a decade before the Civil War began.

13th
Alexander appeared in the 2016 documentary 13th directed by Ava DuVernay. As an interviewee, Alexander described the evolution of racial disparity in the United States of America through its evolution from slavery, the Jim Crow laws, the War on Drugs, to mass incarceration. Alexander said, "So many aspects of the Old Jim Crow are suddenly legal again once you've been branded a felon. And so it seems that in America, we haven't so much ended racial caste but simply redesigned it".

Personal life
In 2002, Alexander married Carter M. Stewart, a graduate of Stanford University and Harvard Law School. Stewart at the time was a senior associate at McCutchen, Doyle, Brown & Enersen, a San Francisco law firm, and later was the U.S. Attorney for the Southern District of Ohio. They have three children. Her father-in-law is a former member of the board of directors of The New York Times.

In a 2019 opinion piece for The New York Times, written subsequent to the passing of the Ohio "Heartbeat Bill", Alexander wrote of being raped during her first semester of law school, becoming pregnant as a result, and then aborting the pregnancy.

Awards 
 2005: Soros Justice Fellowship from the Open Society Institute
 2016: 21st Annual Heinz Award in Public Policy
 2017: The Ohio State University, Office of Diversity and Inclusion's Frank W. Hale Jr. Black Cultural Center's MLK Dreamer Award

See also 
 Joe Biden Supreme Court candidates
 List of law clerks of the Supreme Court of the United States (Seat 2)

References

External links

 Michelle Alexander appearances on C-SPAN
 Tomgram: Michelle Alexander
 TRNN Town Hall: In Conversation with Michelle Alexander at The Real News Network
 "Why Hillary Clinton Doesn't Deserve the Black Vote". Michelle Alexander for The Nation. February 10, 2016.
 "Who We Want to Become: Beyond the New Jim Crow", On Being, April 21, 2016

1967 births
Living people
People from Medford, Oregon
African-American women writers
Vanderbilt University alumni
Stanford Law School alumni
Law clerks of the Supreme Court of the United States
Ohio State University faculty
Moritz College of Law faculty
Activists for African-American civil rights
African-American academics
American Civil Liberties Union people
Prison reformers
American women legal scholars
American legal scholars
American women academics